"Forget Myself" is English rock band Elbow's first single from their third studio album, Leaders of the Free World (2005), released in three formats: two CD singles and one 7-inch vinyl. One of the CDs was a maxi-CD single released on an enhanced CD. The song itself has a technical-like sound as well as usage of doubletracking in the vocals. The song entered the UK Singles Chart at number 22

"Strangeways to Holcombe Hill in 4.20" is an instrumental, reminiscent of several James Bond theme songs. "My Finger" is an Indigo Jones cover, a fellow-Manchester band. "The Good Day" is an atypically glam rock-style track, as well as "McGreggor" were added to the Japanese version of Leaders of the Free World as bonus tracks.

The song was debuted live, originally entitled "Buddha With Mace", at Blueprint Studios in Salford in May 2005, at a one-off gig as part of the Carling 24 Festival.

Track listings
CD1
 "Forget Myself" – 5:22
 "The Good Day" – 3:44

CD2 (Maxi-CD single)
 "Forget Myself" – 5:23
 "Strangeways to Holcombe Hill in 4.20" – 4:22
 "My Finger" – 2:41
 "Forget Myself" (Video) – 3:48

7-inch vinyl
 "Forget Myself" – 5:22
 "McGreggor" – 2:33

References

2005 singles
2005 songs
Elbow (band) songs
Songs written by Guy Garvey
UK Independent Singles Chart number-one singles
V2 Records singles